China National Highway 580 will run from Aksu in Xinjiang to Kangxiwar, also in Xinjiang.  the route is still partially under construction and scheduled to be completed in 2022. The route will traverse the Hindutash through a tunnel.

See also 

 Tarim Desert Highway

References 

Transport in Xinjiang